| tries = {{#expr:
 + 7 + 5 + 8 + 7 + 11 + 11 + 9 
 + 6 + 6 + 5 + 4 + 5 + 6 + 7
 + 13 + 5 + 5 + 9 + 13 + 3 + 7
 + 2 + 5 + 7 + 9 + 9 + 6 + 5
 + 6 + 8 + 7 + 7 + 3 + 8 + 7
 + 3
 + 10 + 5 + 7 + 6 + 9 + 12 + 7
 + 4 + 7 + 2 + 7 + 5 + 6 + 6
 + 7 + 6 + 4 + 5 + 3 + 5 + 9
 + 5 + 10 + 8 + 7 + 3 + 6
 + 8 + 4 + 5 + 5 + 6 + 11 + 9
 + 3 + 6 + 7 + 8 + 5 + 4 + 10
 + 10 + 3 + 6 + 4 + 6 + 7 + 7
 + 4 + 6

 + 4 + 10 + 9 + 8 + 8 + 5 + 5
 + 2 + 3 + 7 + 6 + 3 + 4
 + 6 + 3 + 7  
 + 7 + 8 + 4 + 6 + 11 + 6 + 5
 + 9 + 7 + 8 + 4 + 6 + 6
 + 5 + 7 + 7 + 9 + 4 + 11 + 8
 + 12 + 3 + 7 + 4 + 7 + 5 + 7
 + 9 + 6 + 4 + 11 + 5 + 8 + 10 
 + 9 + 8 + 10 + 3 + 6 + 8 + 11 
 + 6 + 10 + 3 
 + 4 + 6 + 6

}}
| top point scorer = 230 – Richard Hayes (Rotherham Titans)
| top try scorer   = 21 – Rhys Henderson (Sedgley Park) 
| prevseason       = 2021–22
| nextseason       = 2023–24
}}

The 2022–23 National League 2 North is the 35th season of the fourth tier (north) of the English domestic rugby union competitions; one of three at this level. The others are, the newly formed, National League 2 East and National League 2 West. Previously, there were two leagues at level four; this league and National League 2 South. Hull are the current champions and are promoted to National League 1. Owing to the reorganisation of the national leagues, there was there was no play-off match last season and Sedgley Park continue to play at this level. There was no relegation, in the last completed season (2021–22), and Huddersfield (15th) and Harrogate (16th) will also continue to play at this level, due to the increase of tier 4 leagues from two to three.

Structure
The league consists of fourteen teams and each play the others on a home and away basis, to make a total of 26 matches each. The champions are promoted to National League 1 and the last two teams are relegated to Regional 1 North East or Regional 1 North West; depending on their location.

The results of the matches contribute points to the league as follows:
 4 points are awarded for a win
 2 points are awarded for a draw
 0 points are awarded for a loss, however
 1 losing (bonus) point is awarded to a team that loses a match by 7 points or fewer
 1 additional (bonus) point is awarded to a team scoring 4 tries or more in a match.

Participating teams and locations

League table

Fixtures & results
Fixtures for the season were announced by the RFU on 13 June 2022.

Round 1

Round 2

Round 3

Round 4

Round 5

Rescheduled match

Round 6

Round 7

Round 8

Round 9

Round 10

Round 11

Round 12

Round 13

Round 14

Round 15

Round 16

Round 17

Round 18

Rescheduled matches

Round 14 (rescheduled matches)

Round 19

Round 20

Round 21

Round 22

Rescheduled matches

References

External links
 NCA Rugby

2022–23
4N
4N